Psalidojapyx is a genus of diplurans in the family Japygidae.

Species
 Psalidojapyx edentulus Pagés, 2000
 Psalidojapyx murudensis (Silvestri, 1930)

References

Diplura